The Next Generation Combat Vehicle (NGCV) is a United States Army program intended to procure a variety of armored vehicles to add new capabilities to Army units and replace existing platforms that are nearing the end of their service life. The program covers the following systems: 
 Optionally Manned Fighting Vehicle (OMFV), the replacement for the M2 Bradley IFV.
 Armored Multi-Purpose Vehicle (AMPV), the replacement for the M113.
 Mobile Protected Firepower (MPF), a light tank for Infantry Brigade Combat Teams (IBCTs).
 Robotic Combat Vehicle (RCV), three unmanned ground vehicles in light, medium, and heavy configurations.
 Decisive Lethality Platform (DLP), the replacement for the M1 Abrams main battle tank.

Development 
The project began in 2017 after the previous Ground Combat Vehicle program was canceled. The deadline of the projects is expected to be 2035. Multiple groups competed for the bid. The Army gave the contract to a six member consortium - Lockheed Martin, SAIC, GS Engineering, Inc., Moog Inc., Hodges Transportation Inc. and Roush Industries.

Armored Multi-Purpose Vehicle 

Armored Multi-Purpose Vehicle (AMPV) is the replacement for the M113.
In 2014, the Army selected BAE Systems' proposal of a turretless variant of the Bradley Fighting Vehicle.  the program was scheduled to deliver 2,897 AMPVs in five variants.

Mobile Protected Firepower 

Mobile Protected Firepower is a light tank. It is similar to the M8 Armored Gun System program canceled in 1996, or the Stryker M1128 Mobile Gun System being retired in 2022.

In November 2019, the Army released a request for proposals for the Mobile Protected Firepower

In December 2018, the Army downselected BAE Systems' and General Dynamics Land Systems' proposals to move forward.

BAE offered a vehicle based on the M8 Armored Gun System. GDLS offered a variant of the Griffin II.

On June 28th, 2022, the Army selected GDLS Griffin II light tank as the winner of the MPF program with an initial contract of 96 vehicles.

Optionally Manned Fighting Vehicle 

The Optionally Manned Fighting Vehicle is the Army's replacement for the M2 Bradley.

In June 2018, the Army established the Next Generation Combat Vehicle (NGCV) program to replace the M2 Bradley. In October 2018, the program was re-designated as the Optionally Manned Fighting Vehicle (OMFV). The NGCV program was expanded as a portfolio of next-generation vehicles including tanks and the Bradley-based Armored Multi-Purpose Vehicle.

In March 2019 the Army released a request for proposals for the OMFV.

The Army said OMFV will be designed “to engage in close combat and deliver decisive lethality during the execution of combined arms maneuver,” and will have a 30mm cannon and a second-generation forward looking infrared system, or FLIR. Testing of the vehicle is expected to begin in 2020.

A joint venture between Raytheon and Rheinmetall offered a variant of the Lynx KF41, and General Dynamics Land Systems offered a variant of the Griffin III. Both Raytheon-Rheinmetall and GDLS were disqualified, leaving no other competitors. The Army decided to restart the program with less-stringent guidelines.

In July 2021, the Army awarded contracts to five teams: Point Blank Enterprises, Oshkosh Defense, BAE Systems, General Dynamics Land Systems and American Rheinmetall Vehicles. The total value of the contract was $299.4 million. Teams will develop concept designs during the 15-month long phase.

Robotic Combat Vehicle 
, Robotic Combat Vehicle (RCV) is not a Program of Record, meaning the Army has not committed to an acquisition plan.

The RCV is being developed in light, medium and heavy variants. RCV-Light weighs no more than 10 tons, RCV-Medium weighs between 10 and 20 tons, and RCV-H weighs more than 20 and less than 30 tons.

In January 2020, the Army awarded contracts to Qinetiq and Textron. Qinetiq is to build four RCV-Ls, and Textron is to build four RCV-Ms.

See also 
 Ground Combat Vehicle, a U.S. Army infantry fighting vehicle program canceled in 2014
 Future Combat Systems Manned Ground Vehicles, an American family of tracked vehicles that was canceled in 2009
 Interim Armored Vehicle, a U.S. Army combat vehicle acquisition program that resulted in the Stryker
 Armored Systems Modernization, a wide-ranging U.S. Army combat vehicle acquisition program cancelled after the end of the Cold War
 M1299, U.S. Army replacement for the M109 howitzer

References 

Combat vehicles of the United States
Post–Cold War armored fighting vehicles of the United States
Fourth-generation main battle tanks